Town & Country, formerly the Home Journal and The National Press, is a monthly American lifestyle magazine. It is the oldest continually published general interest magazine in the United States.

History

Early history
The magazine was founded as The National Press by poet and essayist Nathaniel Parker Willis and New York Evening Mirror newspaper editor George Pope Morris in 1846. Eight months later, it was renamed The Home Journal. After 1901, the magazine's name became "Town & Country", and it has retained that name ever since.

Throughout most of the 19th century, this weekly magazine featured poetry, essays and fiction. As more influential people began reading it, the magazine began to include society news and gossip in its pages. After 1901, the magazine continued to chronicle the social events and leisure activities of the North American upper class, including debutante or cotillion balls, and also reported on the subsequent "advantageous marriages" that came from people meeting at such social engagements.

The magazine's earlier readership consisted of members of the Establishment. This included older wealthy families of New York City, Boston Brahmins and, later, those people in other parts of the United States whose surnames may have appeared in the Social Register (established 1887).

Willis owned and edited the magazine from 1846 until his death in 1867.

Modern history
After Willis's death, the magazine went through several owners and editors until William Randolph Hearst acquired ownership in 1925. The first editor under Hearst ownership was Harry Bull. He edited the magazine from 1925 through 1949. Henry B. Sell became Bull's successor.

The magazine is still owned and published by the Hearst Corporation. It is published monthly, and its readership is composed of mainly younger socialites, café society, and middle class professionals.

Most of the advertising copy in the magazine is for luxury goods and services. The feature articles and photography focus primarily on fashion, arts, culture, interior design, travel, weddings, parties, gala events and other interests and concerns of the upper class.

In May 1993, Pamela Fiori became the first woman editor-in-chief of Town & Country magazine. During her tenure, Fiori was credited with increasing circulation by making the magazine more fashion forward and in recent years, making philanthropy more of a priority for the magazine.

Fiori also pushed for more diversity in the magazine's coverage. In an effort to play down the magazine's perceived snobbish and elitist WASP, or preppy image, more celebrities have been showing up on the magazine's covers, and there has been an increase in the number of articles showcasing the events and weddings of socially prominent persons of African-American descent, as well as the social activities of people of other ethnicities.

On April 6, 2010, Fiori was replaced by Steven Drucker as the editor-in-chief of the magazine. Jay Fielden was named editor-in-chief in 2011. Fielden was previously editor-in-chief of Men's Vogue. Earlier in his career, he had worked at Vogue and The New Yorker. He said his goal was to bring "a lot of people under the tent" of "a snooty, exclusionary magazine." He later said, "I gave Town & Country some teeth, reporting on behavior that wasn't always that which, well, Emily Post would approve, like having an evening toke instead of a Scotch on the rocks." In 2014, Fielden convinced novelist Jay McInerney to move his column about wine from the Wall Street Journal to Town & Country.

Fielden inaugurated the T&C 50 lists, including rankings of philanthropists and influential American families. In 2014, he founded the Town & Country Philanthropy Summit, which has featured speakers such as Michael Bloomberg, Chelsea Clinton, Julia Louis-Dreyfus, Bradley Cooper, Lin-Manuel Miranda, and Geoffrey Canada. Fielden left Town & Country in 2016, when he replaced David M. Granger as editor-in-chief of Esquire Magazine. Adweek wrote that Fielden had transformed the magazine from "dusty publication to buzzy brand."

According to HuffPost on May 9, 2018, Town & Country took criticism for disinviting Monica Lewinsky from its philanthropic summit because former President Bill Clinton decided to attend the event. Hollywood producer Judd Apatow commented, "This is what everyone is fighting against." He then added that Town & Country "should be ashamed of themselves."

Spin-off
In September 2003, a spin-off magazine entitled, Town & Country Travel, appeared. It is published quarterly. In September 2007, Town & Country Travel launched a travel website and a staff travel blog. There is a special edition of the magazine focusing on wedding planning. In the past decade, the magazine has also published several etiquette, wedding and lifestyle guidebooks. Among the most recent books published by the magazine is "Modern Manners: The Thinking Person's Guide to Social Graces," released in 2005 and edited by Town & Country senior editor Thomas Farley.

In 2003, Town & Country released Town & Country Weddings, which is published twice yearly.

The first international version of the magazine, called Town & Country Philippines, was launched by Summit Media in 2007.

A British Town & Country magazine was launched by Hearst Magazines UK, a subsidiary of Hearst Corporation, in May 2014.

References

External links
 Official website
 Town & Country Travel
 Town & Country Travels blog
 Official British Town & Country website

Fashion magazines published in the United States
Lifestyle magazines published in the United States
Hearst Communications publications
Monthly magazines published in the United States
Magazines established in 1846
Magazines published in New York City
1846 establishments in the United States